Gualey is a Sector in the city of Santo Domingo in the Distrito Nacional of the Dominican Republic. This neighborhood is populated in particular by individuals from the lower class.

Sources 
Distrito Nacional sectors 

Geography of Santo Domingo